The 2008–09 season covers the period from 1 July 2008 to 30 June 2009 and is the club's one hundredth season, having been founded as Dundee Hibernian in 1909.

Review and events
The pre-season period began with a number of new signings at the club. Dundee midfielder Scott Robertson was one of three players to agree pre-contract deals in June and he was followed by fellow player Paul Dixon shortly afterwards. Willo Flood returned on a second successive season-long loan and fellow Cardiff City player Warren Feeney followed on a similar deal, with Spanish striker Francisco Sandaza and Irish forward Roy O'Donovan (loan) the final signings.

A number of players who were out of contract left the club following the end of the 2007–08 season, including Christian Kalvenes who moved to Burnley, and Mark Kerr, who followed Lee Mair, Stuart Duff and Lee Miller in recent years by signing for New Firm rivals Aberdeen. Last season's top scorer Noel Hunt left in July to join his brother Stephen at English side Reading.

Chairman Eddie Thompson died of prostate cancer on 15 October.

Chronological list of events
This is a list of the significant events to occur at the club during the 2008–09 season, presented in chronological order. This list does not include transfers, which are listed in the transfers section below, or match results, which are in the results section.

 22 July: The club reject a £500,000 bid from Reading for striker Noel Hunt.
 23 July: Reading's increased offer for Hunt – thought to be about £600,000 – is considered.
 28 July: Former United player and manager Paul Sturrock announces he has Parkinson's disease, just days before United face his club Plymouth Argyle in a friendly.
28 August: United reject an approach from former manager Craig Brewster – now at Inverness CT – for Darren Dods.
31 August: Former United player Jamie Dolan dies of a heart attack whilst out jogging.
4 September: Garry Kenneth scores in Scotland under-21s 3–1 win against Slovenia. David Robertson also appeared as a late substitute.
6 September: Winger Craig Conway extends his contract until 2011.
9 September: Garry Kenneth's eighth Scotland under-21 cap ends in disappointment as defeat in Denmark ends their hopes of qualifying for the 2009 European Championship.
10 September: Director John Bennett resigns from the board with immediate effect.
20 September: Defender Mihael Kovačević suffers a fractured cheekbone during the closing stages of the 1–0 win at Aberdeen.
15 October: Chairman Eddie Thompson dies after losing his battle with prostate cancer. The match against Rangers, scheduled for three days later, is postponed as a mark of respect.
20 October: The club announce admission for the upcoming match against St Mirren will be only £5 to allow as many as possible to pay their respects to late chairman Eddie Thompson.
22 October: The funeral of late chairman Eddie Thompson is held in Broughty Ferry with around 1,000 supporters attending.
3 November: Rangers chairman David Murray apologises after suggesting abuse between some United and Dundee fans on certain websites was "just as bad" as between Celtic and Rangers.
5 November: Young striker Ryan Dow is named the SPL 'Rising Star' for September.
14 November: Stephen Thompson, son of late chairman Eddie, is officially named as the club's new chairman.
15 November: Scott Robertson is named in the Scotland squad to play Argentina, being called up as a late replacement due to injuries.
18 November: David Goodwillie makes his Scotland under-21 debut as a half-time substitute in the friendly defeat to Northern Ireland.
19 November: Robertson becomes the 19th United player to be capped by Scotland, appearing as a 59th-minute substitute for Barry Ferguson.
28 November: Manager Craig Levein turns down an approach from Football League Championship side Watford.
2 December: Levein signs a new contract until May 2012, with coaches Peter Houston and Gary Kirk following suit.
18 December: Lukasz Zaluska announces he will leave the club at the end of his contract, expecting to join Celtic.
8 January: Captain Lee Wilkie signs a new three-year contract.
12 January: Full-back Sean Dillon joins Wilkie in signing a new three-year contract.
17 January: The contract renewals keep on coming with Garry Kenneth and David Goodwillie signing until May 2012, and David Robertson and Kevin Smith signing until May 2011.
22 January: The seventh, eighth and ninth contract extensions this year are announced, with new deals for Darren Dods, Prince Buaben and Morgaro Gomis.
12 March: The club announce Nike will be the official kit supplier for the next four seasons from 2009–10.
11 April: United's 1–0 victory at Hamilton Academical secures a top-six finish for the second successive season.
18 April: Striker Kevin Smith suffers a broken leg and dislocated ankle while on loan at Raith Rovers, ruling him out for six months.

Match results
Dundee United have played a total of 44 competitive matches during the 2008–09 season, as well as six first team pre-season friendlies. The team finished fifth in the Scottish Premier League.

In the cup competitions, United lost to Celtic in the League Cup semi-final, while they were beaten by Hamilton Academical in the Scottish Cup fifth round.

Friendlies
The club began pre-season by winning the Keyline Cup in Oban on 12 July before embarking on a short trip to Dublin where they played two friendlies against local sides. Upon returning to Scotland, United beat Raith Rovers 4-0 and fellow Fife side Dunfermline Athletic 3-2 before a match against Barcelona for the second year running. The friendlies culminated in a win at Plymouth Argyle where United faced former Terror Paul Sturrock. United also sent sides to play in victories against Cowdenbeath, Arbroath, Forres Mechanics, Dundee North End and Blairgowrie. A final friendly was planned against Lochee United but was postponed due to heavy rain. In April, the club racked up an 8–0 win at Brora Rangers to mark the opening of the ground's new floodlights, with Andis Shala scoring a hat-trick.

Scottish Premier League

United began the season with a televised match away to promoted Hamilton Academical, which – despite taking the lead – they lost 3–1. Subsequent 1–1 draws at home to Celtic – another televised match in which Francisco Sandaza scored his first goal – and away to Motherwell produced the first points of the season but a home defeat to Kilmarnock and narrow defeat away to Hibernian left United bottom of the league after five matches. United's third televised match of the season saw them pick up their first league win at Aberdeen and was the first of four successive league victories, preceding home triumphs against Hearts, Inverness CT and St Mirren. The run of victories saw first league goals for summer signings Scott Robertson and Roy O'Donovan, with three clean sheets for goalkeeper Lukasz Zaluska. The St Mirren match was played three weeks after the Inverness match following the death of chairman Eddie Thompson, which led to the match against Rangers being postponed. As the St Mirren match was the first match following the death of the chairman, prices were reduced to just £5, prompting over 11,000 fans to attend and pay their respects with a minute's silence. United failed to make it five league wins in a row when they drew 0–0 at Falkirk but kept their unbeaten run going with an exciting 3–3 draw against Rangers at Ibrox and got back to winning ways with home wins over Aberdeen and Hibernian. A second successive 2–0 defeat to Kilmarnock – this time away from home – preceded a 1–1 draw at home to Hamilton, before wins at St Mirren and Inverness brought United back-to-back away victories for the first time since April 2007. United were involved in another high scoring match against Rangers in a 2–2 draw at Tannadice and followed it up by holding Hearts to a 0–0 draw at Tynecastle, closing 2008 with a home win against Falkirk.

2009 began with a draw at Celtic Park, despite being two goals behind but United's next match saw a 4–0 home collapse against Motherwell, only the club's second defeat in the previous 17 league matches. An exciting 3–2 win at home to St Mirren preceded a 2–0 defeat against Rangers at Ibrox, before draws at home to Inverness and away to Aberdeen. Rivals for third place Hearts won at Tannadice before United won away at Falkirk, with a defeat at Motherwell tempered by a home draw against Celtic. After conceding first at home for the seventh time in eight matches, United came from two goals down to draw with Hibernian, before beating Hamilton for the first time this season, securing a top six league finish. In the final match before the league split, United failed to gain further ground on Hearts for third place, being held at home by Kilmarnock to a goalless draw, ensuring United failed to score against the Ayrshire side all season. In the first match after the split, United's dominance of the entire match earned a win against Hibernian at Easter Road, before missing the chance to go third after a home draw against Aberdeen. United's final trip to Glasgow resulted in a narrow 2–1 loss against Celtic, with defeats against Heart of Midlothian and Rangers to close the season.

Post-split (Top six)

Scottish Cup

United beat East Stirlingshire 4–0 at Ochilview Park in the Scottish Cup fourth round, with goals from Prince Buaben, Darren Dods, Jon Daly and Johnny Russell. Shortly before the match, United were drawn away to Hamilton Academical in the fifth round, where they were narrowly beaten 2–1, despite leading at half-time.

League Cup

Last season's runners-up United began their League Cup campaign away to Cowdenbeath, where a hat-trick from Jon Daly helped them to a 5–1 win. In the third round, Airdrie United – who United faced in the second round of last year's competition – were beaten 2–0, before a quarter-final win at home to Dunfermline Athletic. United faced Celtic in the semi-finals in late January where they lost11-10 on penalties, a record for a Scottish cup match.

Player stats
During the 2008–09 season so far, United have used 26 different players on the pitch. Łukasz Załuska is the only player to have played every minute this season. The table below shows the number of appearances and goals scored by each player.

|}

Stats
Francisco Sandaza was the top scorer with ten goals, with the team totalling 58 goals. During the 2008–09 season, fifteen United players received at least one caution. In total, the team received 60 yellow cards.

Team statistics

League table

Transfers

In
United signed eleven players during the season. Midfielder Scott Robertson agreed a pre-contract move from rivals Dundee on 3 June and two players agreed similar moves on 17 June, with Northern Irish goalkeeper Michael McGovern agreeing to move from Celtic and German striker Andis Shala arriving from VfR Mannheim. Less than a week later, United signed a second player from Dundee when Scotland under-21 defender Paul Dixon arrived for around £25,000. Willo Flood returned for a second successive season-long loan when terms were agreed with Cardiff City again on 1 July and Cardiff colleague Warren Feeney followed in a similar deal a week later. Shortly afterwards, Spanish striker Francisco Sandaza arrived on a three-year contract from Valencia Mestalla. In August, Craig Levein's pursuit of Roy O'Donovan ended with a season-long deal for the Sunderland striker, although he was recalled in January, as was Willo Flood, ahead of his transfer to Celtic. On transfer deadline day, Paul Caddis moved from Celtic Park until the end of the season, with Australian midfielder James Wesolowski joining on a similar deal from Leicester City although his spell was cut short by injury. Youngster Jennison Myrie-Williams joined in June following his release from Bristol City.

Out
The club sold only one player during the season, with Noel Hunt joining his brother Stephen at English side Reading for around £600,000. Young striker Kevin Smith moved on loan to Raith Rovers until January, with fellow youngsters Johnny Russell and John Gibson moving to Forfar Athletic on similar temporary deals. Young left back Sean Fleming followed suit shortly afterwards when he joined Peterhead for four months. Gibson's loan was subsequently extended until the end of the season, with young first team squad member Keith Watson joining him on a short-term loan, shortly afterwards Marco Andreoni undertook a similar deal with Albion Rovers. Sean Fleming moved back out on loan, joining Andreoni at Albion while young midfielder Ryan McCord moved short-term to Stirling Albion and Gordon Pope headed to Montrose. Kevin Smith went back to Raith after returning to Tannadice for a few weeks, with Johnny Russell returning to Forfar in similar fashion. Towards the end of February, midfielder Greg Cameron moved on loan to Irish outfit Shamrock Rovers, managed by former United player Michael O'Neill and Fraser Milligan departed to Montrose on a similar deal shortly afterwards. Youth goalkeeper Gibson signed a one-year deal with Dundee on his return to Tannadice. Similarly, Fleming, Pope and Milligan all penned two-year deals with Montrose at the end of May.

Awards

Rising Star
Ryan Dow: 1
 September 2008

Playing kit

The jerseys were sponsored for the first time by JD Sports' Carbrini Sportswear label, with the firm also sponsoring the shorts.
Kitmaker Hummel supplied their last strip after the club announced in March 2009 that Nike would begin a four-year deal for the 2009–10 season.

The club has no third strip, with the last third strip used in the 2002–03 season.

See also
 2008–09 Scottish Premier League
 2008–09 Scottish Cup
 2008–09 Scottish League Cup
 2008–09 in Scottish football

References

External links
 Official site: 2008/09 Fixtures
 BBC – Club stats
 Soccerbase – Results | Squad stats | Transfers

Dundee United F.C. seasons
Dundee United